Vijaya may refer to:

Places
 Vijaya (Champa), a city-state and former capital of the historic Champa in what is now Vietnam
 Vijayawada, a city in Andhra Pradesh, India

People
 Prince Vijaya of Sri Lanka (fl. 543–505 BC), earliest recorded king of Sri Lanka
 Vijaya (Satavahana) (c. 3rd century), Indian ruler of the Satavahana dynasty; successor of Yajna Sri Satakarni
 Vijaya Manikya I (r. 1488), king of Tripura
 Vijaya Manikya II (r. 1532–1563), king of Tripura
 Vijaya-Bhattarika (r. c. 650–655), regent of the Chalukya dynasty of southern India
 Vijaya Kumaratunga (1945–1988), Sri Lankan actor, social activist, politician
 Vijaya Nandasiri (1944–2016), Sri Lankan actor, director, producer, singer
 Vijaya Lakshmi Pandit, Indian diplomat and politician

In Hindu mythology
 Vijaya (bow), the personal bow of Shiva and Karna
 Vijaya, daughter of Dyutimat, the king of Madra Kingdom
 Jaya-Vijaya, the door-keepers of Vaikuntha, the realm of the god Vishnu in Hindu mythology

Other uses
 Vijaya Vauhini Studios, a film studio based in Chennai, India
 Vijaya (film), a 1973 Tamil film
 House of Vijaya, a Sinhalese royal dynasty
 Vijaya (font), a font introduced in Windows 7

See also
 Vijaya College (disambiguation)
 
 Vijay (disambiguation)
 Vijayalakshmi
 Vijaynagar (disambiguation)
 Wijaya (disambiguation)